Erythraeus is a genus of mites belonging to the family Erythraeidae. These are large red mites with two pairs of eyes and long legs (the first and fourth pairs are often longer than the body).

References

Nine new species of the superfamily Erythraeoidea (Acarina: Trombidiformes) associated with plants in South Africa, Magdalena K.P. Meyer & P.A.J. Ryke, Acarologia I

Trombidiformes genera